Pavel Augusta (born March 16, 1969) is a Czech former professional ice hockey defenceman.

Augusta played in the Czechoslovak First Ice Hockey League and the Czech Extraliga for ASD Dukla Jihlava, Motor České Budějovice, HC Vsetín, HC Pardubice, HC Slezan Opava, HC Zlin and HC Plzeň. 

He also played in the Deutsche Eishockey Liga for Moskitos Essen and the Tipsport Liga for HKM Zvolen, HK 32 Liptovský Mikuláš, MsHK Žilina, MHK Dubnica and MHC Martin.

References

External links

1969 births
Living people
Czech ice hockey defencemen
HK Dubnica players
HC Dukla Jihlava players
Essen Mosquitoes players
HC Kometa Brno players
MHk 32 Liptovský Mikuláš players
MHC Martin players
Motor České Budějovice players
HC Dynamo Pardubice players
HC Plzeň players
HC Slezan Opava players
Sportspeople from Jihlava
HC Tábor players
VHK Vsetín players
PSG Berani Zlín players
MsHK Žilina players
HKM Zvolen players
Czechoslovak ice hockey defencemen
Czech expatriate ice hockey players in Slovakia
Czech expatriate ice hockey players in Germany